Christy Clark (born March 1, 1966) was a Republican member of the Montana Legislature. She served as vice-chair of the Montana Republican Party. She was elected to House District 17 which represents Teton County, Augusta, and part of Lincoln.

References

External links
Home page

Living people
Republican Party members of the Montana House of Representatives
University of Montana alumni
California State University, Sacramento alumni
Women state legislators in Montana
1966 births
People from Choteau, Montana
21st-century American politicians
21st-century American women politicians